I Never Been in Vienna is a 1989 Argentine drama film directed by Antonio Larreta. It was entered into the 16th Moscow International Film Festival.

Cast
 China Zorrilla as Carlota
 Sergi Mateu as José
 Alberto Segado as Marcelo
 María Teresa Costantini as Adela
 Víctor Laplace as Francisco
 Chunchuna Villafañe as Carolina
 Mercedes Morán as Eugenio
 Hugo Soto as Augusto
 Marcelo Alfaro as Juan Ignacio
 Ricardo Beiro as Hipolito
 Sofía Viruboff as Maria Antonio
 Ofelia Morixe as Carmen

References

External links
 

1989 films
1989 drama films
1980s Spanish-language films
Argentine drama films
1980s Argentine films